John Wesley "Joe" Houser Jr. (born June 21, 1935) is a former American football offensive lineman who played in the National Football League for the Los Angeles Rams, Dallas Cowboys, and St. Louis Cardinals.  He played college football at the University of Redlands.

Early years
Houser attended Boys Republic High School, before moving on to the University of Redlands. In college, he played end, tackle, center, fullback, and was the team's placekicker.

He was a part of the 1956 Bulldog's 9-0-0 team, which defeated Occidental College 28–0 with Jack Kemp at quarterback, and Whittier College in the last collegiate game coached by George Allen before moving to the NFL.

Professional career

Los Angeles Rams
Houser was signed as an undrafted free agent by the Los Angeles Rams after the 1957 NFL Draft. He was named the starter at offensive guard as a rookie.

In 1958, he served a six months military service. He was mostly a backup that played the guard and center position. On September 6, 1960, he was traded to the Dallas Cowboys in exchange for a 1962 seventh round draft choice (#88-Jim Bakken).

Dallas Cowboys
In 1960, he became the first starter at center in Dallas Cowboys franchise history. The next year, he was moved to offensive guard and started 7 games.

In 1962, he missed the entire season with a serious knee injury that he suffered in the first preseason game against the Green Bay Packers. He was waived on September 10, 1963.

St. Louis Cardinals
In 1963, he played for the St. Louis Cardinals. He announced his retirement on May 19, 1964.

Personal life
Houser married Mary Alison Hortie.

References

1935 births
Living people
People from Chino Hills, California
Players of American football from California
American football offensive guards
American football centers
Redlands Bulldogs football players
Sportspeople from San Bernardino County, California
Los Angeles Rams players
Dallas Cowboys players
St. Louis Cardinals (football) players
University of Redlands alumni